Donovan Jeter (born December 7, 1998) is an American football defensive tackle for the Chicago Bears of the National Football League (NFL). He played college football for the Michigan Wolverines. Jeter signed with the Pittsburgh Steelers as an undrafted free agent in 2022 and has also played for the Washington Commanders.

Professional career

Pittsburgh Steelers
After going unselected in the 2022 NFL Draft, Jeter signed with the Pittsburgh Steelers on April 30, 2022. He was waived on August 30 as part of final roster cuts before the start of the 2022 season.

Washington Commanders
Jeter signed with the Washington Commanders on September 12, 2022. He appeared in one game before being released a week later. He was re-signed to the practice squad on September 21. Jeter was released on October 18, 2022.

Chicago Bears
On January 10, 2023, Jeter signed a reserve/futures contract with the Chicago Bears.

References

External links
 Michigan Wolverines bio

1998 births
Living people
American football defensive tackles
Michigan Wolverines football players
People from Beaver Falls, Pennsylvania
Players of American football from Pennsylvania
Pittsburgh Steelers players
Washington Commanders players
Chicago Bears players